The European Union Central American Association Agreement (EU-CAAA) is a free trade agreement between the European Union (EU) and the Central American Common Market. The agreement was signed on 29 June 2012 in Tegucigalpa. The association agreement will have to be formally ratified by the European Union and all of its member states (except Croatia), as well as Costa Rica, El Salvador, Guatemala, Honduras, Nicaragua and Panama and is provisionally applied since 1 August 2013. Upon entry into force, it will create a free trade area between the EU and Central America.

References

Central America
Politics of Central America
Free trade agreements of the European Union
Treaties concluded in 2010